Yeamin Munna (born 2 August 1991) is a Bangladeshi professional footballer who plays as a defender for Sheikh Jamal Dhanmondi Club  in the Bangladesh Premier League. He was also a Bangladesh national football team from 2011 to 2016.

References 

Living people
1991 births
Bangladeshi footballers
Bangladesh international footballers
Sheikh Jamal Dhanmondi Club players
Abahani Limited (Dhaka) players
Sheikh Russel KC players
Mohammedan SC (Dhaka) players
Muktijoddha Sangsad KC players
People from Sylhet
Association football central defenders
Footballers at the 2014 Asian Games
Asian Games competitors for Bangladesh
Bangladesh Football Premier League players